Duncan Busby (born 17 December 1983) in Heswall, Wirral is an English archer.  Busby won two gold medals for England at the 2010 Commonwealth Games in the men's compound team event and in the individual men's compound and the Individual Gold at the same event.

References
 

English male archers
Living people
1983 births
People from Heswall
Commonwealth Games medallists in archery
Commonwealth Games gold medallists for England
Archers at the 2010 Commonwealth Games
Medallists at the 2010 Commonwealth Games